Altar of Plagues were an Irish black metal band, founded in Cork by James Kelly. After gaining attention in the metal community with a series of self recorded demos and EPs, the band released their first studio album, White Tomb, in April 2009 on Profound Lore Records. Following a year of gigging and some changes to the lineup, the group signed with Candlelight Records in January 2010. They released their second album Mammal in 2011, with US/Can and ROW editions featuring alternate artworks. The album's tour included a European headline tour and festival appearances such as the Hopscotch Music Festival in the US. 

Their third album, Teethed Glory and Injury was released in 2013 and met with critical acclaim. Anthony Fantano of the Needle Drop placed it at #3 on The Needle Drop's "Top-50 Albums of 2013" and later placed it at #56 on the "Top 200 Albums of the 2010s. Terrorizer named it #2 on "Terrorizer 50 Albums Of The Year 2013".

On 15 June 2013, Altar of Plagues announced via Facebook that they were splitting up and that their final live performance would be at the Unsound Festival in Poland in October. However, in January 2015, after teasing it for weeks, they announced a few shows to take place in early 2015. In late 2015, the band announced they would embark on one last tour across mainland Europe with fellow Irish band Malthusian (with whom Altar of Plagues' drummer Johnny King also plays). Their final performance was at the Damnation Festival 2015. Kelly now releases music under the name WIFE, while Johnny King drums for the doom metal band Conan.

Band members

Final lineup
 James Kelly - guitar, vocals, keyboards, drums
 Johnny King - drums

Live musicians
 Barry O'Sullivan - guitar
 Barry English - drums
 Stavros Giannopoulos - guitar

Previous members
 Dave Condon - Bass, Vocals
 Bryan O'Sullivan - guitar
 Jeremiah Spillane - guitar

Discography

Studio albums
 White Tomb (2009)
 Mammal (2011)
 Teethed Glory and Injury (2013)

Demos and EPs
 First Plague (2006)
 Through the Cracks of the Earth (2007)
 Tides (2010)
 Split with Year of No Light (2011)

References

External links

 

Irish black metal musical groups
Irish post-rock groups
Musical groups established in 2006
Musical groups disestablished in 2013
2006 establishments in Ireland
2013 disestablishments in Ireland
Musical groups from Cork (city)
Musical quartets
Blackgaze musical groups
Profound Lore Records artists